A dohol(Persian:دهل) is a large cylindrical drum with two skinheads. It is generally struck on one side with a wooden stick bowed at the end, and with a large thin stick on the other side, though it is also played with the bare hands. It is the principal accompaniment for the Sorna. A similar instrument, the Dhol, is used in traditional Egyptian, Pakistani and Indian music.

The dohol is largely played in Kurdistan with the zurna.

In Iran
The dohol in Iran is mostly played in wedding ceremonies and other celebrations. The dohol is mostly played with a sorna.

In Afghanistan
The dohol in Afghanistan is mostly played on special ceremonies such as wedding ceremonies. The "Surnay or Sorna" is mostly played with it. The Afghan dance Attan is traditionally performed with both the Dohol and Surnay.

See also
Baluchi music
Caucasian Dhol
Davul
Dhol
Kurdish music
Afghan music

References
 Mehran Poor Mandan, The Encyclopedia of Iranian Old Music, Tehran, 2000.

External links
Sorna and dohol video on YouTube

Drums
Directly struck membranophones
Afghan musical instruments
Kurdish musical instruments
Folk instruments of Sindh
Iranian inventions